This is a list of cruisers of the Royal Navy of the United Kingdom from 1877 (when the category was created by amalgamating the two previous categories of frigate and corvette) until the last cruiser was decommissioned more than a century later. There are no longer any cruisers in the Royal Navy.

First class cruisers 
Armoured cruisers were protected by a belt of side armour and an armoured deck. In the Royal Navy this classification was not actually used, the term first class cruiser being used instead for both armoured cruisers and large protected cruisers. Thus, the first class cruisers built between the Orlando class (1886) and the Cressy class (1897) were, strictly speaking, protected cruisers as they lacked an armoured belt. The first class cruiser was succeeded by the Battlecruiser in the Royal Navy. 

 Shannon first class armoured cruiser, (1875) 5,670 tons, 2×10in, 7×9inch
 Shannon (1875) – Sold 1899
 Nelson class first class armoured cruiser, 7,473 tons, 4×10-inch, 6×9-inch
 Nelson (1876) – Sold 1910
 Northampton (1876) – Sold 1905
 Imperieuse class first class armoured cruiser, 8,500 tons, 4×9.2inch, 10×6inch
 Imperieuse (1883) – Sold 1913
 Warspite (1884) – Sold 1905
 Orlando class first class armoured cruiser, 5,600 tons, 2×9.2-inch, 10×6-inch
 Orlando  (1886) – Sold 1905
 Australia  (1886) – Sold 1905
 Undaunted  (1886) – Sold 1907
 Narcissus  (1886) – Sold 1906
 Galatea  (1887) – Sold 1905
 Immortalite  (1887) – Sold 1907
 Aurora  (1887) – Sold 1907
 Blake class first class protected cruiser, 9,150 tons, 2 × 9.2-inch, 10 × 6-inch
 Blake (1889) – Sold 1922
 Blenheim (1890) – Sold 1926
 Edgar class first class protected cruiser, 7,700 tons, 2× 9.2-inch, 10×6-inch
 Edgar (1890) – Sold 1921
 Hawke (1891) – Torpedoed 1914
 Endymion (1891) – Sold 1920
 Royal Arthur (1891) – Sold 1921
 Gibraltar (1892) – Sold 1923
 Grafton (1892) – Sold 1920
 St George (1892) – Sold 1920
 Theseus (1892) – Sold 1921
 Crescent (1892) – Sold 1921
 Powerful class first class protected cruiser, 14,200 tons, 2×9.2-inch, 12× 6-inch
 Powerful (1895) – Sold 1929
 Terrible (1895) – Sold 1932
 Diadem class first class protected cruiser, 11,000 tons, 16× 6-inch
 Diadem (1896) – Sold 1921
 Niobe (1897) – To Canada as HMCS Niobe, BU 1922
 Europa (1897) – Sold 1920
 Andromeda (1897) – Sold 1956
 Amphitrite (1898) – Sold 1920
 Argonaut (1898) – Sold 1920
 Ariadne (1898) – Torpedoed 1917
 Spartiate (1898) – Sold 1932
 Cressy class first class armoured cruiser, 12,000 tons, 2×9.2-inch, 12×6-in
 Cressy (1899) – Torpedoed 1914
 Sutlej (1899) – Sold 1924
 Aboukir (1900) – Torpedoed 1914
 Hogue (1900) – Torpedoed 1914
 Bacchante (1901) – Sold 1920
 Euryalus (1901) – Sold 1920
 Drake class first class armoured cruiser, 14,150 tons, 2× 9.2-inch, 16×-6-inch
 Drake (1901) – Torpedoed 1917
 Good Hope (ex-Africa) (1901) – Sunk during the Battle of Coronel, 1914
 King Alfred (1901) – Sold 1920
 Leviathan (1901) – Sold 1920
 Monmouth class first class armoured cruiser, 9,800 tons, 14× 6-inch
 Monmouth (1901) – Sunk during the Battle of Coronel, 1914
 Bedford (1901) – Wrecked on 21 August 1910 off Quelport Island in the China Sea
 Essex (1901) – Sold 1921
 Kent (1901) – Sold 1920
 Berwick (1902) – Sold 1920
 Cornwall (1902) – Sold 1920
 Cumberland (1902) – Sold 1921
 Donegal (1902) – Sold 1920
 Lancaster (1902) – Sold 1920
 Suffolk (1903) – Sold 1920
 Devonshire class first class armoured cruiser, 10,850 tons, 4× 7.5-inch, 6× 6-inch
 Devonshire (1904) – Sold 1921
 Hampshire (1903) – Mined 1916
 Carnarvon (1903) – Sold 1921
 Antrim (1903) – Sold 1922
 Roxburgh (1904) – Sold 1921 
 Argyll (1904) – Wrecked 1915
 Duke of Edinburgh group first class armoured cruiser
 Duke of Edinburgh class 13,550 tons, 6× 9.2-inch, 10× 6-inch
 Duke of Edinburgh (1904) – Sold 1920
 Black Prince (1904) – Sunk at the Battle of Jutland, 1916
 Warrior class 13,550 tons, 6x 9.2-in, 4x 7.5-in
 Warrior (1905) – Sunk at the Battle of Jutland, 1916
 Cochrane (1905) – Wrecked 1918
 Achilles (1905) – Sold 1921
 Natal (1905) – Explosion 1915
 Minotaur class first class armoured cruiser, 14,600 tons, 4× 9.2-inch, 10× 7.5-inch
 Minotaur (1906) – Sold 1920
 Shannon (1906) – Sold 1922
 Defence (1907) – Sunk at the Battle of Jutland, 1916

Protected cruisers
Protected cruisers were so-called because their vital machinery spaces were protected by an armoured deck and the arrangement of coal bunkers. The ships below are all protected cruisers, but were rated as second and third class cruisers by the Royal Navy. The third class cruiser was not expected to operate with the fleet, was substantially smaller than the second class and lacked the watertight double-bottom of the latter. With the advent of turbine machinery, oil firing and better armour plate the protected cruiser became obsolete and was succeeded by the light cruiser.
 Iris class second class cruiser, 3,730 tons, 10-64pdr
 Iris (1877)
 Mercury (1878)
 Comus class third class cruiser, 2,380 tons (Constance 2,590 tons), 2-7in + 12-64pdr (except Comus 4-6in + 8-64pdr; Canada & Cordelia 10-6in)
 Comus (1878) – Sold 1904
 Curacoa (1878) – Sold 1904
 Champion (1878) – Sold 1919
 Cleopatra (1878) – Sold 1931
 Carysfort (1878) – Sold 1899
 Conquest (1878) – Sold 1899
 Constance (1880) – Sold 1899
 Canada (1881) – Sold 1897
 Cordelia (1881) – Sold 1904
 Leander class second class cruiser, 4,300 tons, 10-6in
 Leander (1882) – Sold 1920
 Arethusa (1882) – Sold 1905
 Phaeton (1883) – Sold 1947
 Amphion (1883) – Sold 1906
 Calypso class third class cruiser, 2,770 tons, 4-6in + 12-5in
 Calypso (1883) – Sold 1922
 Calliope (1884) – Sold 1951 (drill ship from 1907)
 Surprise class third class cruiser, 1,700 tons, 4-5in
 Surprise (1885)
 Alacrity (1885)
 Mersey class second class cruiser, 4,050 tons, 2-8in, 10-6in
 Mersey (1885) – Sold 1905
 Severn (1885) – Sold 1905
 Thames (1885) – Renamed General Botha, scuttled 1947
 Forth (1886) – Sold 1921
 Scout class third class torpedo cruiser, 1,580 tons, 4-5in
 Scout (1885)
 Fearless (1886)
 Archer class third class torpedo cruiser, 1,770 tons, 6-6in
 Archer (1885)
 Mohawk (1886)
 Brisk (1886)
 Porpoise (1886)
 Cossack (1886)
 Tartar (1886)
 Serpent (1887)
 Racoon (1887)
 Marathon class second class cruiser, 2,850 tons, 6-6in
 Magicienne (1888)
 Medea (1888) – Sold 1914
 Medusa (1888) – Sold 1920
 Marathon (1888)
 Melpomene (1888)
 Barracouta class third class cruiser, 1,580 tons, 6-4.7in
 Barracouta (1889)
 Barrosa (1889)
 Blanche (1889)
 Blonde (1889)
 Barham class third class cruiser, 1,830 tons, 6-4.7in
 Barham (1889)
 Bellona (1890)
 Pearl class third class cruiser, 2,575 tons, 8-4.7in
 Pandora (1889)
 Psyche (1889)
 Phoenix (1889)
 Pelorus (1889)
 Persian (1890)
 Pallas (1890)
 Phoebe (1890)
 Pearl (1890)
 Philomel (1890)
 Apollo class second class cruiser, 3,400 tons, 2-6in, 6-4.7in
 Latona (1890) – Sold 1920
 Melampus (1890) – Sold 1910
 Andromache (1890)
 Sirius (1890) – Scuttled 1918
 Terpsichore (1890) – Sold 1914
 Naiad (1890) – Sold 1922
 Pique (1890) – Sold 1911
 Thetis (1890) – Scuttled 1918
 Sybille (1890) – Wrecked 1901
 Apollo (1891)
 Tribune (1891) – Sold 1911
 Spartan (1891) – Renamed Defiance 1921, sold 1931
 Indefatigable (1891)
 Rainbow (1891) – To Canada as HMCS Rainbow 1910
 Sappho (1891) – Sold 1921
 Intrepid (1891) – Scuttled 1918
 Brilliant (1891)
 Retribution (1891) – Sold 1911
 Scylla (1891) – Sold 1914
 Aeolus (1891)
 Iphigenia (1891) – Scuttled 1918
 Astraea class second class cruiser, 4,360 tons, 2-6in, 8-4.7in
 Bonaventure (1892) – Sold 1920
 Cambrian (1893) – Sold 1923
 Astraea (1893) – Sold 1920
 Charybdis (1893) – Sold 1922
 Fox (1893) – Sold 1920
 Hermione (1893) – Renamed Warspite, sold 1940
 Flora (1893) – Renamed Indus II, sold 1922
 Forte (1893) – Sold 1914
 Eclipse class second class cruiser, 5,600 tons, 5-6in, 6-4.7in
 Eclipse (1894)
 Talbot (1895)
 Venus (1895)
 Minerva (1895)
 Juno (1895)
 Diana (1895)
 Doris (1896) – Sold 1919
 Dido (1896) – Sold 1926
 Isis (1896)
 Arrogant class second class cruiser, 5,750 tons, 4-6in, 6-4.7in
 Arrogant (1896) – Sold 1923
 Furious (1896) – Renamed Forte 1915, sold 1923
 Gladiator (1896) – Collision 1908, refloated, sold 1909
 Vindictive (1897) – Scuttled 1918
 Pelorus class third class cruiser, 2,135 tons, 8-4in
 Proserpine (1896)
 Pelorus (1896)
 Pactolus (1896)
 Pegasus (1897) – Sunk 1914
 Perseus (1897)
 Pomone (1897)
 Pyramus (1897)
 Psyche (1898) – To Australia 1915
 Prometheus (1898)
 Pioneer (1899) – To Australia 1912, scuttled 1931
 Pandora (1900)
 Highflyer class second class cruiser, 5,650 tons, 11-6in
 Hermes (1898) – Torpedoed 1914
 Highflyer (1898) – Sold 1921
 Hyacinth (1898) – Sold 1923
 Challenger class second class cruiser, 5,880 tons, 11-6in
 Challenger (1902) – Sold 1920
 Encounter (1902) – To Australia 1912 as HMAS Encounter, renamed Penguin 1923, scuttled 1932
 Topaze class third class cruiser, 3,000 tons, 12-4in
 Topaze (1903) – Sold 1921
 Amethyst (1903) – Sold 1920
 Diamond (1904) – Sold 1921
 Sapphire (1904) – Sold 1921

Scout cruisers
The scout cruiser was a smaller, faster, more lightly armed and armoured cruiser than the protected cruiser, intended for fleet scouting duties and acting as a flotilla leader. Essentially there were two distinct groups – the eight vessels all ordered under the 1903 Programme, and the seven later vessels ordered under the 1907-1910 Programmes. The advent of better machinery and larger, faster destroyers and light cruisers effectively made them obsolete.
 Sentinel class 2,880 tons, 10 x 12pdr
 Sentinel (1904) – Sold 1923
 Skirmisher (1905) – Sold 1920
 Adventure class 2,640 tons, 10 x 12pdr
 Adventure (1904) – Sold 1920
 Attentive (1904) – Sold 1920
 Forward class 2,860 tons, 10 x 12pdr
 Forward (1904) – Sold 1921
 Foresight (1904) – Sold 1920
 Pathfinder class 2,900 tons, 10 x 12pdr
 Pathfinder (1904) – Torpedoed 1914
 Patrol (1904) – Sold 1920
 Boadicea class 3,300 tons, 6 x 4in
 Boadicea (1908)
 Bellona (1909)
 Blonde class 3,350 tons, 10 x 4in
 Blonde (1910)
 Blanche (1909)
 Active class 3,440 tons, 10 x 4in
 Active (1911)
 Amphion (1911)
 Fearless (1912)

Light cruisers
The light armoured cruiser – light cruiser – succeeded the protected cruiser; improvements in machinery and armour rendering the latter obsolete. The  of 1910 were rated as second-class protected cruisers, but were effectively light armoured cruisers with mixed coal and oil firing. The  of 1913 were the first oil-only fired class. This meant that the arrangement of coal bunkers in the hull could no longer be relied upon as protection and the adoption of destroyer-type machinery resulted in a higher speed. This makes the Arethusas the first "true example" of the warship that came to be recognised as the light cruiser. In the London Naval Treaty of 1930, light cruisers were officially defined as cruisers having guns of 6.1 inches (155 mm) calibre or less, with a displacement not exceeding 10,000 tons.
 Town classBristol group 4,800 tons, two 6-in & ten 4-in guns
 Bristol (1910)
 Glasgow (1910)
 Gloucester (1910)
 Liverpool (1910)
 Newcastle (1910)Weymouth group 5,250 tons, eight 6-in guns
 Weymouth (1911)
 Dartmouth (1911)
 Falmouth (1911)
 Yarmouth (1912)Chatham group 5,400 tons, eight 6-in guns
 Chatham (1912)
 Dublin (1913)
 Southampton (1912)
  (1916)
  (1913)
  (1913)Birmingham group 5,440 tons, nine 6-in guns
 Birmingham (1914)
 Lowestoft (1914)
 Nottingham (1914)
  (1922)Birkenhead group 5,185 tons, ten 5.5-in guns
 Birkenhead (1915)
 Chester (1916)
 Arethusa class, 3,750 tons, two 6-in & six 4-in guns
 Arethusa (1914)
 Aurora (1914)
 Galatea (1914)
 Inconstant (1915)
 Penelope (1914)
 Phaeton (1915)
 Royalist (1915)
 Undaunted (1914)
 C class Caroline group 4,219 tons, two 6-in & eight 4-in guns
 Caroline (1914)
 Carysfort (1914)
 Cleopatra (1915)
 Comus (1914)
 Conquest (1915)
 Cordelia (1914)
 Calliope group 4,228 tons, two 6-in & eight 4-in guns
 Calliope (1914)
 Champion (1915)
 Cambrian group 4,320 tons, two 6-in & eight 4-in guns
 Cambrian (1916)
 Canterbury (1915)
 Castor (1915)
 Constance (1915)
 Centaur group 4,165 tons, five 6-in guns
 Centaur (1916)
 Concord (1916)
 Caledon group 4,180 tons, five 6-in guns
 Caledon (1916)
 Calypso (1917) – torpedoed 1940
 Cassandra (1916) – struck a mine 1918
 Caradoc (1916)
 Ceres group 4,190 tons, five 6-in guns
 Cardiff (1917)
 Ceres (1917)
 Coventry (1917) – sunk 1942
 Curacoa (1917) – sunk in collision 1942
 Curlew (1917) – bombed 1940
 Carlisle group 4,290 tons, five 6-in guns
 Cairo (1918) – torpedoed 1942
 Calcutta (1919) – bombed in 1941
 Capetown (1919)
 Carlisle (1918)
 Colombo (1918)
 Danae class 4,850 tons, six 6-in guns
 Danae (1918)
 Dauntless (1918)
 Dragon (1918) – scuttled 1944
 Delhi (1919)
 Dunedin (1919) – torpedoed 1941
 Durban (1921) – scuttled 1944
 Despatch (1922)
 Diomede (1922)
 Emerald class 7,580 tons, seven 6-in guns
 Emerald (1926)
 Enterprise (1926)
 Leander class Leander group 7,200 tons, eight 6-in guns
  (1933) – to the Indian Navy 1948 as the 
 Ajax (1935)
  (1933)
 Neptune (1934) – struck a mine 1941
 Orion (1934)
 Amphion group 6,900 tons, eight 6-in guns
 Amphion (1936) – to Royal Australian Navy 1939 as  – torpedoed 1942
 Apollo (1936) – to RAN 1938 as 
 Phaeton (1935) – to RAN 1935 as  – sunk 1941
 Arethusa class 5,220 tons, six 6-in guns
 Arethusa (1935)
 Aurora (1937) – Sold on 19 May 1948 to the Republic of China Navy
 Galatea (1935) – torpedoed 1941
 Penelope (1936) – torpedoed 1944
 Town class 
 Southampton group 9,100 tons, 12 6-in guns
 Southampton (1937) – sunk 1941
 Birmingham  (1937)
 Glasgow  (1937)
 Newcastle  (1937)
 Sheffield (1937)
 Gloucester group 9,400 tons, 12 6-in guns
 Gloucester (1939) – bombed 1941
 Liverpool  (1938)
 Manchester (1938) – sunk 1942
 Edinburgh group 10,565 tons, 12 6-in guns
 Edinburgh (1939) – sunk 1942
 Belfast (1939) – Currently a museum ship in London
 Dido classDido group 5,600 tons, ten 5.25-in guns
 Bonaventure (1940) – torpedoed 1941
 Dido (1940)
 Hermione (1941) – torpedoed 1942
 Naiad (1940) – torpedoed 1942
  (1940)
 Euryalus (1941)
 Sirius (1942)
 Charybdis (1941) – torpedoed 1943
 Cleopatra (1941)
 Scylla (1942)
 Argonaut (1942)Bellona group 5,770 tons, eight 5.25-in guns
 Bellona (1943) – to Royal New Zealand Navy 1956
 Black Prince (1943) – to RNZN 1948
 Diadem (1943) – to Pakistani Navy 1956 as 
 Royalist (1943) – to RNZN 1956
 Spartan (1943) – bombed 1944
  Fiji group 8,525 tons, 12 6-in guns
 Bermuda (1942)
 Fiji (1940) – bombed 1941
  (1942)
 Jamaica (1942)
 Kenya (1940)
 Mauritius (1941)
  (1940) – to Indian Navy as 
 Trinidad (1941) – bombed 1942
 Ceylon group 8,875 tons, nine 6-in guns
  (1943) – to Peruvian Navy as  1959
 Newfoundland (1943) – to Peruvian Navy as  1959
 Uganda (1943) – to Royal Canadian Navy as HMCS Quebec 1944
 Minotaur class 8,800 tons, nine 6-in guns
 Swiftsure (1944)
 Minotaur (1945) – to Royal Canadian Navy 1945 as Ontario
 Superb (1945)
 Tiger class 11,700 tons, four 6-in & six 3-in guns. Laid down during WWII as Minotaur class ships
Tiger (1959)
Lion (1960)
Blake (1961)

Heavy cruisers
The heavy cruiser was defined in the London Naval Treaty of 1930 as a cruiser with a main gun calibre more than 6 inches but not exceeding 8 inches. The earlier Hawkins class were therefore retrospectively classified as such, although they had been initially built as "improved light cruisers". The County were built as light cruisers with most of them in service at the time of the Treaty of London, after which they were also redesignated as heavy cruisers. A further three Countys were cancelled. The York class was a reduced version of the County to build more ships within tonnage limits. 
 [[Hawkins-class cruiser|Hawkins class]] (also known as Cavendish) or  9,860 tons, 7x 7.5-inch
 Cavendish (1918) – completed as aircraft carrier Vindictive, converted to cruiser in 1925, to training ship 1937
 Hawkins (1919) – scrapped 1947
 Raleigh (1920) – wrecked 1922
 Frobisher (1924) – scrapped 1949
 Effingham (1925) – wrecked 1940
 County class, 8x 8-inch
 Kent group 10,570 tons
Cumberland (1928) – scrapped 1959
Berwick (1928) – scrapped 1948
Cornwall (1928) – bombed 1942
Suffolk (1928) – scrapped 1948
Kent (1928) – scrapped 1948
 Australia (1928) – Royal Australian Navy, scrapped 1955 
 Canberra (1928) – Royal Australian Navy, torpedoed 1942
 London group 9,830 tons
 London (1929) – scrapped 1950
 Devonshire (1929) – scrapped 1954
 Shropshire (1929) – to Royal Australian Navy 1943, scrapped 1955
 Sussex (1929) – scrapped 1950
 Norfolk group 10,300 tons
 Norfolk (1930) – scrapped 1950
 Dorsetshire (1930) – sunk by dive bombers in Far East 1942
 York class modified County design 8,250 tons, 6x 8-inch
 York (1930) – damaged by explosive motor boats, salvage abandoned and wrecked 1941, scrapped 1952
 Exeter (1931) – sunk 1942, Far East

Large light cruisers
The "large light cruisers" were a pet project of Admiral Fisher to operate in shallow Baltic Sea waters and they are often classed as a form of battlecruiser.
 [[Courageous-class battlecruiser|Courageous or Glorious class]] 
 Glorious group 19,320 tons, 4-15in, 18-4in
 Glorious (77) (1916) – converted to aircraft carrier 1924-1930
 Courageous (50) (1916) – converted to aircraft carrier 1924-1928
 Furious  19,513 tons, 2-18in, 11-5.5in 
 Furious (47) (1917) – completed as aircraft carrier

Minelaying cruisers
These "minelaying cruisers" were the only purpose-built oceangoing minelayers of the Royal Navy. The Abdiel class could reach 38 knots and in practice were used as fast transports to supply isolated garrisons (eg Malta and Tobruk)
 Adventure  6,740 tons, 4-4.7in
 Adventure (M23) (1926) – converted to repair ship 1944, scrapped 1947
 Abdiel class
 1938 group 2,650 tons, 6-4in
Abdiel (M39) (1941) – sunk in Taranto Bay 1943
Latona (M76) (1941) – sunk off Libya 1941
Manxman (M70) (1941) – scrapped 1972
Welshman (M84) (1941) – sunk off Crete 1943
 Wartime Emergency Programme group 2,650 tons, 4-4in
Ariadne (M65) (1944) – scrapped 1965
Apollo (M01) (1944) – scrapped 1962

Helicopter cruisers
Two ships of the Tiger-class were rebuilt to each operate four helicopters. Tiger (C20) and Blake (C99) served for part of the 1970s before they were withdrawn from service.

Through deck cruisers
Although at times called "through deck cruisers", the Invincible class of the 1980s were small aircraft carriers.

See also
 List of cruisers

Cruisers
 
Royal Navy
Royal Navy